The 2018 World Group II Play-offs are four ties which involves the losing nations of the World Group II and four nations from the three Zonal Group I competitions. Nations that win their play-off ties enter the 2019 World Group II, while losing nations join their respective zonal groups.

Russia vs. Latvia

Spain vs. Paraguay

Canada vs. Ukraine

Japan vs. Great Britain

References 

World Group II Play-offs